Kundby is a small town, with a population of 758 (1 January 2022), located in Holbæk Municipality on the northwestern part of Zealand in Region Zealand, Denmark.

Notable people 
 Christian Christensen (1926 in Kundby – 2005) a Danish professional middleweight boxer, took part in the 1948 Summer Olympics

See also
 The Kundby case

References

Cities and towns in Region Zealand
Holbæk Municipality